Ectoedemia coscoja is a moth of the family Nepticulidae. It is endemic to Spain (Catalunya, Aragon, Andalusia).

The wingspan is 4.3-5.1 mm. Adults are on wing from June to July. There is probably one generation per year.

The larvae feed on Quercus coccifera. They mine the leaves of their host plant. The mine consists of a sinuous or contorted, gradually widening gallery, often following a vein for some distance, filled with brown or black frass. Pupation takes place outside of the mine.

External links
Fauna Europaea
bladmineerders.nl
Western Palaearctic Ectoedemia (Zimmermannia) Hering and Ectoedemia Busck s. str. (Lepidoptera, Nepticulidae): five new species and new data on distribution, hostplants and recognition

Nepticulidae
Moths of Europe
Moths described in 2009